The Iloilo Science and Technology University  (also referred to as ISAT-U or ISAT) is a state research university located in La Paz, Iloilo City, Philippines. Founded in 1905 under the American colonial government of the Philippines, it is mandated and chartered as a polytechnical university by the Philippine government to provide undergraduate and graduate courses in technology education, agriculture, fishery, engineering, arts and sciences, forestry, business, health, computer, criminology, nautical and short-term vocational-technical and other continuing courses. It attained its university status in 2013 renaming it to its present name, the Iloilo Science and Technology University (ISAT-U).

As a public research university, ISAT-U is also mandated to promote research, advanced studies, extension work and progressive leadership in its area of specialization. Its main campus is located in Burgos St., La Paz, Iloilo City with external campuses in Leon, Miag-ao, Barotac and Dumangas.

History
ISAT-U was established in 1905 as an elementary trade school known as the Iloilo Trade School.

By virtue of Commonwealth Act No. 313 in 1939, the school was converted into a National School of Arts and Trade with Iloilo School of Arts and Trades as its official name. In 1940, the school offered the Two-year Teacher Education Curriculum for the graduates of the secondary trade schools and Three-Year Education Curriculum for graduates in general high school.

In 1951, the school was authorized to open the degree of Bachelor of Science in Industrial Education (BSIE). The school was made a training center in the development of industrial arts program when the team of Industrial Educators from Stanford University arrived in 1957. In 1968, it also became a training center for implementation of the reconstructed manpower program of the National Manpower and Youth Council. In 1974, the Educational Development Project Implementation Task Force (EDPITAF) identified the school as the Regional Staff Development Center (RSDC) for Practical Arts in Western Visayas. It also pioneered in the implementation of the graduate program for vocational technical education in 1976 offering the degree Master of Arts in Teaching Vocational Education.

In May 1983, by virtue of Batas Pambansa Blg. 395, the school was converted into a chartered state college known as the Western Visayas College of Science and Technology.

The university acquired a  lot across the road in addition to its present  area that accommodates the main campus.

The college was elevated to a university in June, 2013 and changed its name to Iloilo Science and Technology University.

Logo
ISAT U Logo Symbols and Meaning
Laurel Fronds represents glory, honor, and success of the university. Atom stands for science and technology, which are the main thrust of the university. Gear represents technology and the history, traditions and identity of the university. Inside the gear, is the name Iloilo Science and Technology University in Times New Roman which was established in 1905. Book and torch, the open book symbolizes knowledge and power while the torch with the flame stands for enlightenment and wisdom. The text written inside the open book is the Republic Act No. 10595 which is an act converting Western Visayas College of Science and Technology (WVCST) into a State University to be known as Iloilo Science and Technology University (ISAT U). Industry represents the service where the graduates of the university are employed after completing the education.

Newspaper
The Technovator is the university's college publication.

Campuses
The Iloilo Science and Technology University has five campuses to date.
 Iloilo Science and Technology University (ISAT-U - Main Campus), Lapaz, Iloilo City
 ISAT U- Miagao Campus (Former: Southern Iloilo Polytechnic College-SIPC) - Miagao, Iloilo
 ISAT U- Dumangas Campus (Former: Purification Dolar Monfort College-PDMC) - Dumangas, Iloilo
 ISAT U- Barotac Nuevo Campus (Former: Don Jose Sustiguer Monfort Memorial National College-DJSMMNC) - Barotac Nuevo, Iloilo
 ISAT U- Leon Campus (Former: Leon National College of Agriculture-LNCA) - Leon, Iloilo

References

External links
 

State universities and colleges in the Philippines
Universities and colleges in Iloilo City